Bukovinka is a municipality and village in Blansko District in the South Moravian Region of the Czech Republic. It has about 600 inhabitants.

History
The first written mention of Bukovinka is from 1268.

References

Villages in Blansko District